The YJ-7 is a Chinese subsonic anti-ship missile. It is manufactured by the Third Academy of the China Aerospace Science and Industry Corporation (CASIC). The export version of the YJ-7 is the C-701.

History
The radar-guided C-701 was displayed by the China Precision Machinery Import-Export Corporation (CPMIEC) at the 2004 China International Aviation & Aerospace Exhibition.

In April 2006, it was reported that radar-guided C-701s were fired during Iranian military exercises.

Variants
YJ-7
C-701 AR: Export version with active radar seeker
C-701T:  Export version with electro-optical seeker
FL-10: "Cheaper version" of the C-701
Kowsar: Iranian version of C-701

Operators

Current operators

Armed Forces of the Islamic Republic of Iran: C-701, Kowsar (patrol boats, shore batteries, Helicopters)

People's Liberation Army Navy: YJ-7 (Harbin Z-8 and Z-9C helicopters)

See also
Kh-25
Sea Skua

References

Bibliography

Guided missiles of the People's Republic of China
Anti-ship cruise missiles of the People's Republic of China
Air-to-surface missiles
Military equipment introduced in the 2000s